Single-Handed is an Irish television drama series, first broadcast on RTÉ Television in 2007. Three two-episode, single-story series aired one each on consecutive nights in 2007, 2008 and 2009. Series Four, consisting of three stories told over six episodes, began in RTÉ One November 2010.

The series is partially inspired by garda corruption in County Donegal.

Production
The first series was shot in October 2006. It was directed by Colm McCarthy; the second and third by Antony Byrne. Barry Simner wrote the screenplay. It was co-produced by Touchpaper Television Productions and Element Pictures. Clare Alan also produced the third series.

In 2009, all three series were broadcast in the United Kingdom on ITV, as double-length, two-hour episodes on three consecutive Sundays, from 2–16 August.

Series 4 began broadcasting on RTÉ One on Sunday, 7 November 2010. It was shown in the UK on ITV from Thursday, 14 July 2011.

Casting
Owen McDonnell was given the lead role of Garda Sergeant Jack Driscoll after receiving a call from casting director Maureen Hughes. Appearing onstage in The Lieutenant of Inishmore in the Town Hall, Galway at the time, McDonnell, alongside two other cast members, left for Dublin to read a script for the original Single-Handed director Colm McCarthy. He was given the lead role one day later.

Reception
The series has been consistently popular in Ireland since its first broadcast, with the first series receiving a 40% audience share. However, leading actor Owen McDonnell has been able to escape a significant increase in recognition by the general public as, according to him, "once you're out of the uniform you're fairly anonymous".

Irish Critics

Positive reviews 
John Boland, writing in the Irish Independent, praised the original Single-Handed for its "taut and suggestive" screenplay. Heralding it as "the real deal" and "that rare oddity—an RTE drama that works" and drawing comparisons to the Roman Polanski film Chinatown, he said "it didn't lose its nerve by resorting to far-fetched plot twists or ludicrous melodrama". Boland's report on the sequel indicated his view that it "wasn't as arresting as its predecessor but it was a superior drama all the same". Boland viewed Single-Handed: The Drowning Man as also being a "superior drama" whilst "a sense of place was arrestingly captured, too".

Negative reviews 
Gavin Corbett, writing in the Sunday Tribune, dismissed the original series as "an uninspired piece of writing brought to some sort of lugubrious half-life, superficially engaging for a while, but growing more and more ponderous and pofaced the longer it went on over its two nights". Patrick Freyne, also writing in the Sunday Tribune, called Single-Handed 3 "all puffed up with a melodramatic 'I-can't-believe-it's-not-drama' form of drama in which people glare at one another, shout, are unhelpfully abrasive for no reason, and give each other symbolic bullets".

British reception 

The UK debut of Single-Handed received 4 million viewers which is a large viewership number.

Positive reviews 

The Daily Telegraph, a broadsheet in the UK, said Single-Handed was "distinctly classy" and "not soft-centred. In fact it's more like biting into an apple only to find there's a worm in it". The regional newspaper, Leicester Mercury, remarked that it "confounds expectations from the very beginning", saying "it was dark, not dreary. And slow, not stupid. There wasn't even a hint of Irish whimsy about it. No-one's eyes twinkled, humorously. No fiddly jigs and reels drifted from the pub. And no-one—praise be—mentioned the damned craic".

Negative reviews 
When Single-Handed eventually aired in the UK in 2009, Boland noted the reactions of the British newspaper critics, remarking satirically on how "The Guardians Sam Wollaston and The Independents Tom Sutcliffe couldn't contain their surprise that dark doings lurked behind the 'stunning scenery' of this Irish Hoirtbeat. Faith and begorrah, lads, shure we're even in the EU".

Criticism 
Owen McDonnell has been criticised for suggesting that alcoholism and depression are widespread in Connemara.

Awards

Irish Film and Television Awards
Single-Handed received one nomination at the Irish Film and Television Awards in 2008. It was nominated in the Drama Series/Soap category but lost to The Tudors.

|-
| 2008 || Single-Handed || Drama Series/Soap || 
|-

Seoul International Drama Awards
Single Handed 3: The Drowning Man received two nominations at the Seoul International Drama Awards. Anthony Byrne was nominated in the Best Director category and Barry Simner was nominated in the Best Writer category.

|-
| 2009 || Anthony Byrne || Best Director || 
|-
| 2009 || Barry Simner || Best Writer || 
|-

Episodes

Overseas 

Under the name "Jack Driscoll," the series was aired at least twice in Denmark on the primary Public Service channel DR 1. The channel does not use adverting breaks, so each story was shown as a 90 to 100 episode.

In Finland, the national broadcaster Yle aired the first three seasons during 2017–2018 and the second run was in the spring/summer of 2020, under the name "Vastavirtaan" (Against the Current).

References

External links
 Single-Handed series 3 and Single-Handed series 4
 

2007 Irish television series debuts
Irish crime television series
Irish drama television series
RTÉ original programming
Television shows set in the Republic of Ireland
2010 Irish television series endings